The Dublanc River is a river in Dominica. It rises on the northwestern slopes of Morne Diablotins, flowing west to reach the Caribbean Sea on the country's northwestern coast.

Rivers of Dominica